Brandy Donaghy (born 1972 or 1973) is an American politician serving as a member of the Washington House of Representatives, representing the 44th district since 2021. A member of the Democratic Party, she was appointed to the House by the Snohomish County Council in December 2021 to fill a vacancy created by the resignation of Representative John Lovick. Donaghy also ran for the Snohomish County Council in 2021 against incumbent Republican Sam Low.

References

1970s births
Year of birth uncertain
Living people
Women state legislators in Washington (state)
21st-century American politicians
21st-century American women politicians
Democratic Party members of the Washington House of Representatives